Catherine Barclay (born 12 June 1973) is a former professional tennis player from Australia.

Barclay's parents were the owners of a tennis facility in Sydney, and she began playing tennis at the age of eight.

In her junior career, she was a winner of the Wimbledon girls' doubles.

In her professional career, she won three ITF titles in singles and 30 in doubles. She was a quarterfinalist in the Wimbledon women's doubles and mixed doubles. In the 2002 season, she won two double titles on the WTA Tour.

On 30 August 2000, she was awarded the Australian Sports Medal for her strong commitment to tennis.

Catherine Barclay retired in 2004.

In 2003, she married field hockey player Christopher Reitz of Germany, and they reside in Sydney, Australia.

WTA career finals

Doubles: 8 (2 titles, 6 runner-ups)

ITF Circuit finals

Singles: 10 (3–7)

Doubles: 45 (30–15)

References

External links
 
 

1973 births
Living people
Australian female tennis players
Sportswomen from New South Wales
Tennis players from Sydney
Wimbledon junior champions
Recipients of the Australian Sports Medal
Grand Slam (tennis) champions in girls' doubles